Badger Mountain may refer to:

Badger Mountain (Colorado)
Badger Mountain (Douglas County, Washington), in Central Washington near Wenatchee
Badger Mountain (Tri-Cities), in southeastern Washington